For the history of the Jews in the United Kingdom, including the time before the formation of the Kingdom of Great Britain in 1707, see:

 History of the Jews in England
 History of the Jews in Scotland
 History of the Jews in Northern Ireland
 History of the Jews in Wales

See also

Many of the following articles relate to Jewish history in the British Empire:

 Baghdadi Jews
 British Jews
 British Mandate of Palestine
 History of the Jews in Australia
 History of the Jews in Canada
 History of the Jews in Colonial America
 History of the Jews in Gibraltar
 History of the Jews in Ireland
 History of the Jews in New Zealand
 History of the Jews in South Africa

 
History
Religion in the British Empire
History of the United Kingdom by topic
United Kingdom